Zolotkovo is a rural locality (a settlement) and the administrative center of Posyolok Zolotkovo, Gus-Khrustalny District, Vladimir Oblast, Russia. The population was 2,727 as of 2010. There are 28 streets.

Geography 
Zolotkovo is located 43 km southeast of Gus-Khrustalny (the district's administrative centre) by road. Zolotkovsky is the nearest rural locality.

References 

Rural localities in Gus-Khrustalny District